Mallard is a city in Palo Alto County, Iowa, United States. The population was 257 at the time of the 2020 census.

History
Mallard got its start circa 1882, following construction of the Des Moines and Fort Dodge Railroad through that territory. The town was named by the railroad president, an avid hunter, from mallard ducks inhabiting the area ponds.

Geography
Mallard is located at  (42.937269, -94.684169).

Demographics

2010 census
At the 2010 census there were 274 people in 119 households, including 81 families, in the city. The racial makup of the city was 96.4% White, 0.4% Native American, 2.9% from other races, and 0.4% from two or more races. Hispanic or Latino of any race were 4.4%.

Of the 119 households 30.3% had children under the age of 18 living with them, 53.8% were married couples living together, 5.9% had a female householder with no husband present, 8.4% had a male householder with no wife present, and 31.9% were non-families. 26.1% of households were one person and 14.3% were one person aged 65 or older. The average household size was 2.30 and the average family size was 2.68.

The median age was 44 years. 24.1% of residents were under the age of 18; 7% were between the ages of 18 and 24; 20.5% were from 25 to 44; 27.8% were from 45 to 64; and 20.8% were 65 or older. The gender makeup of the city was 52.9% male and 47.1% female.

2000 census
At the 2000 census there were 298 people in 133 households, including 86 families, in the city. The racial makup of the city was 98.66% White, and 1.34% from two or more races.

Of the 133 households 26.3% had children under the age of 18 living with them, 55.6% were married couples living together, 3.8% had a female householder with no husband present, and 35.3% were non-families. 32.3% of households were one person and 21.1% were one person aged 65 or older. The average household size was 2.24 and the average family size was 2.83.

22.1% are under the age of 18, 6.0% from 18 to 24, 21.1% from 25 to 44, 22.8% from 45 to 64, and 27.9% 65 or older. The median age was 46 years. For every 100 females, there were 97.4 males. For every 100 females age 18 and over, there were 96.6 males.

The median household income was $28,056 and the median family income  was $31,806. Males had a median income of $26,528 versus $11,917 for females. The per capita income for the city was $16,451. About 12.7% of families and 12.1% of the population were below the poverty line, including 19.0% of those under the age of eighteen and 8.1% of those sixty five or over.

Education 
It is within the West Bend–Mallard Community School District. It was established on July 1, 1995, by the merger of the West Bend and Mallard school districts.

Notable people

Mark Kacmarynski, running back who played for the Frankfurt Galaxy in NFL Europe during the 1999 season; born in Mallard.
Frank Mulroney, relief pitcher who played for the Boston Red Sox during the 1930 season; born in Mallard.

References

Cities in Iowa
Cities in Palo Alto County, Iowa